John Joseph Riley (December 29, 1910 – January 19, 1993) was an Irish-born  Canadian ice hockey centre during the 1930s. He played in the National Hockey League between 1933 and 1936 with the Montreal Canadiens and Boston Bruins. The rest of his career, which lasted from 1929 to 1945, was spent in various minor leagues.

Playing career
Born in Birchinlee, Ireland in 1910. Riley was raised in Calgary, Alberta, playing for the Calgary Indians of the Calgary City Junior Hockey League. He was member of a Memorial Cup losing side while with the Indians.

Riley played three seasons in the NHL, with the Montreal Canadiens and Boston Bruins. Following 104 NHL games he scored a total of 10 goals and 22 assists for 32 points, recording 8 penalty minutes. He would go on to play in the AHA and lead the Tulsa Oilers in scoring during the 1936–37 season. Riley died in Vancouver in 1993.

Career statistics

Regular season and playoffs

References

External links

1910 births
1993 deaths
Boston Bruins players
Boston Cubs players
Canadian expatriate ice hockey players in the United States
Canadian ice hockey centres
Chicago Shamrocks players
Cleveland Indians (IHL) players
Detroit Olympics (IHL) players
Hershey Bears players
Irish emigrants to Canada (before 1923)
Irish ice hockey centres
Minneapolis Millers (AHA) players
Montreal Canadiens players
Philadelphia Rockets players
Seattle Eskimos players
Ice hockey people from Calgary
Sportspeople from Derbyshire
Tulsa Oilers (AHA) players
Vancouver Lions players
Wichita Skyhawks players